Amorphoscelis pulchra is a species of praying mantis native to Ivory Coast, Ghana, Cameroon, Congo basin, and Sierra Leone.

See also
List of mantis genera and species

References

Amorphoscelis
Mantodea of Africa
Insects described in 1908